This is a complete list of riders who have competed in the a World Longtrack Championship final (1957-1996) and Grand-Prix Series (1997-2019).

Index

A
  Fred Aberl 
  Tommi Ahlgren
  Josef Aigner
  Oliver Allen
  John Andersen
  Evert Andersson 
  Josef Angermüller
  Andrew Appleton
  Tony Atkin
  Scott Autrey

B
  Daniel Bacher
  Steve Baker
  Trevor Banks
  Robert Barth
  Troy Batchelor
  Paul Bauer
  Robert Bauman
  Mark Beishuizen
  David Bellego
  Dimitri Bergé
  Philippe Bergé
  Christoph Betzl
  Julian Bielmeier
  Francesco Biginato
  Steve Bishop
  Inge Bjerk
  Hans Peter Boisen 
  Preben Bollerup
  Kenneth Borgenhaugh
  Uppie Bos
  Andy Bossner
  Egil Bratvold
  Bohumil Brhel
  Barry Briggs
  Tony Briggs
  Bernd Broker
  Gunther Bunning
  Jason Bunyan
  Stanisław Burza
  Alf Busk

C
  Bertil Carlsson
  Julien Cayre
  Marek Cejka
  Vlastimil Cervenka
  Josef Chalupa
  Anthony Chauffour
  Preben Moller Christensen
  Les Collins
  Peter Collins
  Phil Collins
  Shane Colvin
  Detlaf Conradi
  Paul Cooper
  Marvyn Cox
  Simon Cross
  Jason Crump
  Glenn Cunningham

D
  Marcel Dachs
  Alfred Dannmeyer
  Roland Dannö
  Stefan Dannö
  Tony Dart
  Jannick de Jong
  Jackie de Vries
  Jarno de Vries
  Richard di Biasi
  Theo di Palma
  Bernd Diener
  Heinrich Diener
  Max Dilger
  Bernd Dinklage
  Jeremy Doncaster
  Kai Dorenkamp
  Aleš Dryml Sr.
  Christophe Dubernard
  Gabriel Dubernard
  Jordan Dubernard
  Alexander Dubrana
  Wilhelm Duden
  Tommy Dunker

E
  Colin Earl
  Maik Edensing
  Einar Egedius
  Markus Eibl
  Erik Eijbergen
  Sam Ermolenko
  Sergej Eroshin

F
  Dirk Fabriek
  Sven Fahlen
  Birger Forsberg
  Jaroslaw Franc
  Josef Franc
  Leo Frantila
  Nadine Frenk
  Paul Fry
  Ove Fundin

G
  Klaus Peter Gerdemann
  Marcel Gerhard
  Walter Gernert
  Uwe Gessner
  Georg Gilgenreiner
  Don Godden
  Mitch Godden
  Steven Goret
  Emiel Groen
  Jim Groen
  Maik Groen
  Walter Grubmuller
  Erik Gundersen
  Lars Gunnestad
  Henrik Gustafsson

H
  Georg Hack
  Borivoj Hadek
  Michael Hadek
  Martin Hagon
  Bo Hakansson
  Richard Hall
  Einar Hansen
  Henning Hansen
  Kenneth Kruse Hansen
  Lars B. Hansen
  Roger Hansen
  Nils Haraldsen
  Sverre Harrfeldt 
  Chris Harris
  Michael Hartel
  Roberto Haupt
  Aarni Heikkila
  Csaba Hell
  Gunnar Hilsen
  Josef Hofmeister
  Cord Heinrich Hoft
  Jan Holub
  Zdenek Holub
  Berndt Hornfeldt
  Strider Horton
  Jon Hovind 
  David Howe
  Heinz Huber
  Kai Huckenbeck
  Christian Hulshorst
  Romano Hummel
  Paul Hurry
  Basse Hveem

J
  Brian Jacobsen
  Enrico Janoschka
  Joel Jansson
  Lubomir Jedek
  Bent Nørregaard-Jensen 
  Finn Rune Jensen
  Jiri Jirout
  Svein Johansen 
  Steve Johnston
  Thomas H. Jonasson
  John Jørgensen
  Kauko Jousanen
  Rainer Junglin
  Kim Rudi Juritzen

K

  Karel Kadlec
  Joachim Kall
  Josef Kamper
  Brian Karger
  Pavel Karnas
  Antonín Kasper Jr.
  Rudolf Kastl
  Jan Kater
  Stephan Katt
  Stefan Kekec
  Thorsten Kerl
  Horst Kinkelbur
  Oleg Kiptev
  Bjorn Knutsson
  Antal Kocso
  Vlado Kocuvan
  Fritz Koning
  Ari Koponen
  Esko Koponen
  Reijo Koski
  Odvar Kristiansen 
  Tony Kroeze
  Matthias Kroger
  Toni Kroger
  Michaele Krupnikova
  Stanislav Kubíček
  Zdeněk Kudrna
  Oleg Kurguskin
  Eino Kylmakorpi
  Joonas Kylmäkorpi

L
  Adam Labedzki
  Kalevi Lahtinen
  Timo Laine
  Otto Lantenhammer
  Klaus Lausch
  Frantisek Ledecky 
  Michael Lee
  Rene Lehtinen
  Mark Lemon
  Jeremy Coste Lescoul
  Jerome Lespinasse
  Goerg Limbrunner
  Bert Lindarw
  Sture Lindblom
  Ralf Loding
  Reima Lohkovuori
  Mark Loram
  Nick Lourens

M
  Jaroslav Machac
  Danny Maassen
  Karl Maier
  Zdenek Majstr
  Martin Malek
  Brendan Manu
  Walter Matl
  Ivan Mauger
  Maxime Mazeau
  Mika Meijer
  Dave Meijerink
  Thore Melbye
  Anders Mellgren
  Veikko Metsahuone 
  Anders Michanek
  Alessandro Milanese
  Václav Milík Sr.
  Massimo Mora
  Shawn Moran
  Chris Morton
  Egon Muller
  Hans-Jorg Muller
  Heiko Muller
  Aki Pekka Mustonen
  Jesse Mustonen

N
  Otto Niedermeier
  Jan Holm Nielsen
  Hans Nielsen
  Jens-Henry Nielsen
  Kai Niemi
  Svend Nissen
  Kent Noer
  Olle Nygren
  Tage Nyholm
  Joel Nystrom

O
  Jon Ødegaard
  Matti Olin
  Ole Olsen
  Pavel Ondrasik
  Petr Ondrašík
  Ake Ostblom
  Fabrice Ostyn
  Philippe Ostyn

P
  Antti Pajari
  Arne Pander
  Jan Pape
  Shane Parker
  Erik Pedersen
  Jan O. Pedersen
  Bruce Penhall
  Valter Persson
  Bo Petersen
  Kurt W. Petersen
  Lasse Pettersson
  David Pfeffer
  Glen Phillips
  Theo Pijper
  Hans Otto Pingel
  Andre Pollehn
  Manfred Poschenreider
  Kristian Præstbro
  Stig Pramberg
  Jaroslav Ptak
  Simo Pulli
  Purzer Georg

R
  Mikko Rahko
  Daniel Rath
  Matt Read
  Richter Frantisek 
  Erik Riss
  Gerd Riss
  Marius Rokeberg
  Preben Rosenkilde
  Jens Rossig
  Ole Rostad
  Sjoerd Rozenberg
  Herbert Rudolph

S
  Conny Samuelsson
  Walter Scherwitzki
  Werner Schlott
  Zdenek Schneiderwind
  Steve Schofield
  Sirg Schutzbach
  Bobby Schwartz
  Gottfried Schwarze
  Joe Screen
  Josef Seidl
  James Shanes
  Mitch Shirra
  Hans Siegl
  Sven Sigurd
  Erling Simonsen
  Josef Sinzinger
  Adolf Slabon
  Andy Smith
  Martin Smolinski
  Per Olof Söderman
  Rune Sörmander
  Heikki Sorri
  Emil Sova
  Richard Speiser
  Milan Spinka
  Heinrich Sprenger jnr
  Heinrich Sprenger snr
  Jiří Štancl
  Edgar Stangeland
  Roger Steen
  Gaetan Stella
  Agnar Stenlund 
  Erik Stenlund
  Hynek Stichauer
  Mark Stiekema
  Hakan Storm
  Bertil Strid
  Toni Svab jnr
  Antonín Šváb Sr.
  Jiri Svoboda
  Pascal Swart

T
  Juhani Taipale
  Kelvin Tatum
  Neville Tatum
  Sam Taylor
  Jorg Tebbe
  Ilmo Terrace
  Cyril Thomas
  Willihard Thomsson
  John Titman
  Willy Tjissem
  Luboš Tomíček Sr.
  Mathieu Trésarrieu
  Sebastian Trésarrieu
  Stephane Trésarrieu
  Vladimir Trofimov
  Hans Trovik
  Mario Trupkovic
  Aulis Tuominen
  Olavi Turunen

U
  Josef Unterholzner
  Hans Utterstrom

V
  Louis-Alberto Vallejos
  Piet van Aartsen
  Anne van der Helm
  Steven van der Helm
  Henry van der Steen
  Rene van Weele
  Petr Vandirek
  Roy Verbrugge
  Jan Verner
  Miloslav Verner 
  Václav Verner
  Heinz Viets
  Hermann Viets
  Jaroslav Volf
  Andreas Volker

W
  Fabian Wachs
  Zach Wajtknecht
  Gunther Walla
  Hans Wassermann
  Chris Watson
  Craig Watson
  Runo Wedin
  Otto Weiss
  Rolf Westerberg
  Alois Wiesböck
  Simon Wigg
  Poul Wissing
  Richard Wolff
  Cameron Woodward
  Jeffrey Wortman

Z
  Lars Zandvliet
  Hans Zierk
  Manfred Zimmermann

References 

Individual Long Track World Championship